Lothar Hempel (born 1966 in Cologne) is a German artist based in Berlin. He attended Kunstakademie Düsseldorf from 1987 to 1992.

Artistic practice
Hempel transforms the exhibition space into a stage on which the visitor becomes an actor in a story full of cross-references and contradictions. The works are at once the synopsis, the set, the characters and the props of a play. They represent the different parts of a narrative created out of references to German history, psychology, Greek tragedy, cinema, music, political and social history, neurology, and modern dance, for instance..

Hempel borrows a number of different styles and strategies, whether invented by Dada, Constructivism, the Bauhaus or Joseph Beuys. He uses visual metaphors by incorporating images or found objects.

Exhibition history
In 2007 Hempel's work was the subject of the retrospective exhibition 'Alphabet City' curated by Florence Derieux at Le Magasin, Grenoble. Museum exhibitions include Casanova, The Douglas Hyde Gallery, Dublin (2008); Concentrations 42, Dallas Museum of Art, Dallas (2002), and Propaganda, Institute of Contemporary Arts, London (2002). Lothar Hempel's work has been included in the exhibitions Heaven, Athens Biennale (2009), Le Song D’un Poete, Frac des Pays de la Loire, Nantes (2009); Beaufort 03, Triennial for Contemporary Art, Blankenberge (2009); 7th Gwangju Biennial (2008); Pale Carnage, Arnolfini, Bristol and DCA, Dundee (2007); Imagination becomes Reality. Werke aus der Sammlung Goetz, ZKM – Museum für Neue Kunst, Karlsruhe (2007).

Hempel has exhibited regularly since 1991, during which time his work has been seen in exhibitions at art institutions, among them: the Venice Biennale; Tate Liverpool, ICA, London; Stedelijk Museum, Amsterdam; MoMA PS1, New York; Museum of Contemporary Art, Chicago; Portikus, Frankfurt am Main; Secession, Vienna; Centre Georges Pompidou, Paris.

Solo Exhibitions

2018
Le Terrain Vague, Modern Art, London
Koexistenz, Window on Broad project space, Rosenwald-Wolf Gallery, University of the Arts, Philadelphia, PA, USA
Gargoyle, Italic, Berlin, Germany
2017
Oral Heart, Anton Kern Gallery, New York, NY, USA
FUTURE MUSIC, Casado Santapau, Madrid, Spain
2016
Working Girl, Sies + Höke, Düsseldorf, Germany
Sex and the City, Art : Concept, Paris, France
2015
Tropenkoller, Modern Art, London
2014
PEOPLE LIKE YOU MAKE IT EASY, Anton Kern Gallery, New York, NY, USA
Luggage and Observations, Galerie Klaus Gerrit Friese, Stuttgart, Germany
2013
Loneliness is a cloak you wear, a deep shade of blue is always there, Gerhardsen Gerner, Berlin, Germany
Songs for the Blind, Hezi Cohen Gallery, Tel Aviv, Israel
Art Basel Parcours, Museum Kleines Klingental, Basel, Switzerland
2012
The Story of the Old New Girls, Art : Concept, Paris, France
Opium, La Conservera, Ceuti, Spain
2011
Suedehead, Anton Kern Gallery, New York, NY, USA
2010
Silberblick / Squint, Modern Art, London
ZOO, Sadler's Wells, London
Pyramix Pix, c/o – Gerhardsen Gerner, Berlin, Germany
2009
Kats, Nerves, Shadows & Gin, Anton Kern Gallery, New York, NY, USA
Rise and Fall, MGM, Oslo, Norway
Cafe Kaputt, Gio Marconi, Milan, Italy
2008
Casanova & Other Problems, Modern Art, London
Casanova, Douglas Hyde Gallery, Dublin, Ireland
Signal, Art : Concept, Paris, France
2007
Alphabet City, Magasin – Centre National d’Art Contemporain, Grenoble, France
Modern Art, London
Effetti Speciali, Atle Gerhardsen, Berlin, Germany
2006
Vanessa Baird - Me, myself and the other one, Atle Gerhardsen, Berlin, Germany
Umbrella, Anton Kern Gallery, New York, NY, USA
Tarantella, Bar Ornella, Cologne, Germany
2005
Casa Musica (extrema), Atle Gerhardsen, Berlin, Germany
Butterfly, c/o Alte Gerhardsen, Art Nova, Art Basel Miami Beach, Miami, FL, USA
2004
Fieber/Fever: 5 New Paintings and Other Stories, Anton Kern Gallery, New York, NY, USA
Ikarus, Art : Concept, Paris, France
On The Olympus, Unlimited Contemporary Art, Athens, Greece
Versteck!, with Petra Hollenbach, Parkhaus, Düsseldorf, Germany
2003
Der Gesang der Vögel ist Sinnlos!, The Song of the Bird is Nonsense, Anton Kern Gallery, New York, NY, USA
2002
Diamanten, c/o Atle Gerhardsen, Berlin, Germany
Fleisch: Maschine, Magnani, London
Concentrations 42, Dallas Museum of Art, Dallas, TX, USA
Propaganda, Institute of Contemporary Arts, London
Wespennest, Dallas Museum of Art, Dallas, TX, USA
2001
Magnet, Art : Concept, Paris, France
2000
Das Orakel l’chelt. das Orakel lacht. das Orakel l’chelt, Ars Futura Galerie, Zurich, Switzerland
An Schlaf ist Nicht zu Denken, Lab of Gravity, Hamburg, Germany
Wespennest (Wasps Nest) Anton Kern Gallery, New York, NY, USA
1999
Amerika Verschwindet nur das L’cheln Bleibt (America Disappears Only the Smile Remains), Anton Kern Gallery, New York, NY, USA
KAPUTT und die Folgen (Kaputt and the Consequences), Robert Prime, London
Videos, Centre Saint Gervais, Geneva, Switzerland
1998
Ein Sandstrand voll Glas (A Beach Full of Glass), Galerie Daniel Buchholz, Cologne, Germany
Kunstschnee will Schmelzen, Bureau Amsterdam, Stedelijk Museum, Amsterdam, Netherlands
1997
Samstag Morgen, Zuckersumpf, Robert Prime, London
This Bittersweet Disaster, Anton Kern Gallery, New York, NY, USA
1996
Strom, Anton Kern Gallery, New York, NY, USA
The Bienenkorb Times, Galerie Daniel Buchholz, Cologne, Germany
FRAC Languedoc Roussillon, Montpellier, France
1994
LOW, Artistbooth, Cologne Art Fair, Cologne, Germany
LA BOUM, with Thorsten Slama, New Reality Mix, Stockholm, Sweden2007
Alphabet City, Magasin – Centre National d’Art Contemporain, Grenoble, France
Modern Art, London
Effetti Speciali, Atle Gerhardsen, Berlin, Germany
2006
Vanessa Baird - Me, myself and the other one, Atle Gerhardsen, Berlin, Germany
Umbrella, Anton Kern Gallery, New York, NY, USA
Tarantella, Bar Ornella, Cologne, Germany
2005
Casa Musica (extrema), Atle Gerhardsen, Berlin, Germany
Butterfly, c/o Alte Gerhardsen, Art Nova, Art Basel Miami Beach, Miami, FL, USA
2004
Fieber/Fever: 5 New Paintings and Other Stories, Anton Kern Gallery, New York, NY, USA
Ikarus, Art : Concept, Paris, France
On The Olympus, Unlimited Contemporary Art, Athens, Greece
Versteck!, with Petra Hollenbach, Parkhaus, Düsseldorf, Germany
2003
Der Gesang der Vögel ist Sinnlos!, The Song of the Bird is Nonsense, Anton Kern Gallery, New York, NY, USA
2002
Diamanten, c/o Atle Gerhardsen, Berlin, Germany
Fleisch: Maschine, Magnani, London
Concentrations 42, Dallas Museum of Art, Dallas, TX, USA
Propaganda, Institute of Contemporary Arts, London
Wespennest, Dallas Museum of Art, Dallas, TX, USA
2001
Magnet, Art : Concept, Paris, France
2000
Das Orakel l’chelt. das Orakel lacht. das Orakel l’chelt, Ars Futura Galerie, Zurich, Switzerland
An Schlaf ist Nicht zu Denken, Lab of Gravity, Hamburg, Germany
Wespennest (Wasps Nest) Anton Kern Gallery, New York, NY, USA
1999
Amerika Verschwindet nur das L’cheln Bleibt (America Disappears Only the Smile Remains), Anton Kern Gallery, New York, NY, USA
KAPUTT und die Folgen (Kaputt and the Consequences), Robert Prime, London
Videos, Centre Saint Gervais, Geneva, Switzerland
1998
Ein Sandstrand voll Glas (A Beach Full of Glass), Galerie Daniel Buchholz, Cologne, Germany
Kunstschnee will Schmelzen, Bureau Amsterdam, Stedelijk Museum, Amsterdam, Netherlands
1997
Samstag Morgen, Zuckersumpf, Robert Prime, London
This Bittersweet Disaster, Anton Kern Gallery, New York, NY, USA
1996
Strom, Anton Kern Gallery, New York, NY, USA
The Bienenkorb Times, Galerie Daniel Buchholz, Cologne, Germany
FRAC Languedoc Roussillon, Montpellier, France
1994
LOW, Artistbooth, Cologne Art Fair, Cologne, Germany
LA BOUM, with Thorsten Slama, New Reality Mix, Stockholm, Sweden
OMRON: six videos by Lothar Hempel, Preview Theatre Wardour Street, London
Bewegungslehre (No Future), Buchholz und Buchholz, Cologne, Germany
1992
240 Minuten, with George Graw, Galerie Esther Schipper, Cologne, Germany

Galleries

Lothar Hempel is represented by Art:Concept, Paris; Giò Marconi Gallery, Milan; Gerhardsen Gerner, Berlin/Oslo; Anton Kern Gallery, New York; Stuart Shave/Modern Art, London, and Casado Santapau Gallery, Madrid.

Selected Collections
Astrup Fearnley Museum of Modern Art, Oslo, Norway

David Roberts Art Foundation, London

Centre national des arts plastiques, Paris, France

Fondazione Morra Greco, Naples, Italy

Fondazione Sandretto Re Rebaudengo, Turin, Italy

FRAC Champagne-Ardenne, Reims, France

FRAC Limousin, Limoges, France

FRAC des Pays de la Loire, Carquefou, France

Galerie für Zeitgenössische Kunst GfZK, Leipzig, Germany

Honart Museum / Ebrahim Melamed Collection, Tehran, Iran

Museum of Contemporary Art, Los Angeles, CA, USA

Museum of Modern Art, New York, NY, USA

Sammlung Goetz, Munich, Germany

The Saatchi Gallery, London

Zabludowicz Collection, London

References

External links
 https://www.artforum.com/print/reviews/200706/lothar-hempel-15382
 Lothar Hempel at Gerhardsen Gerner, Berlin/Oslo
Lothar Hempel at Stuart Shave/Modern Art
Lothar Hempel in Frieze (magazine)
Lothar Hempel – Painting – Saatchi Gallery
Artfacts

1966 births
Living people
Kunstakademie Düsseldorf alumni
German contemporary artists